Jangheung Ma clan is one of the Korean clans. Their Bon-gwan is in Jangheung County, South Jeolla Province. Jangheung Ma clan was divided from Mokcheon Ma clan and  both were sorted as the same kind of clans. According to the research held in 2000, the number of the Jangheung Ma clan was 28337. Ma clan began when Ma Wan became the member of Gojoseon with Gija. Their founder was  who was one of the leading members of Baekje’s foundation.  was a descendant of Ma Wan.

See also 
 Korean clan names of foreign origin

References

External links 
 

 
Korean clan names of Chinese origin
Ma clans